Kemmerer is the largest city in and the county seat of Lincoln County, Wyoming, United States. Its population was 2,656 at the 2010 census.

History
Explorer John C. Frémont discovered coal in the area during his second expedition in 1843. The Union Pacific Coal Company opened the first underground mine in 1881 after construction of the Oregon Short Line Railroad from Granger to Oregon.

He named the company and town after his financial backer, Pennsylvania coal magnate Mahlon S. Kemmerer (1843–1925). In 1950, the operation converted to strip mining and became the world's largest open pit coal mine. In 1980 the Kemmerer Coal Co. was sold to the Pittsburg & Midway Coal Company, now a subsidiary of the Westmorland Coal Company. The pit remains in operation with an annual output of about 5 million tons.

Quealy sold lots in the townsite rather than lease them, which permitted the establishment of independent businesses. The company's subsidiary, Frontier Supply Company, provided electricity by utilizing a used $1,150 generator acquired in Utah. Quealy immigrated from Ireland. In Wyoming, he and his wife became active in Democratic Party politics and in St. Patrick's Church, for which the company donated land.

Quealy was the founding president of the First National Bank, established in 1900. Kemmerer Savings Bank was founded in 1909.  Its president Asbury D. Hoskins was manager of the Blyth-Fargo-Hoskins Company, and was elected Wyoming state treasurer in 1919.

The J. C. Penney company store was founded in Kemmerer in 1902.

Geography

The Fossil Butte National Monument is located 15 miles west of Kemmerer, on U.S. Highway 30.

Climate

According to the Köppen Climate Classification system, Kemmerer has a warm-summer humid continental climate, abbreviated "Dfb" on climate maps.

Demographics

2010 census
As of the census of 2010, there were 2,656 people, 1,078 households, and 704 families living in the city. The racial makeup of the city was 93.2% White, 0.2% African American, 1.2% Native American, 0.4% Asian, 3.9% from other races, and 1.0% from two or more races. Hispanic or Latino of any race were 7.8% of the population.

There were 1,078 households, of which 30.7% had children under the age of 18 living with them, 57.7% were married couples living together, 4.2% had a female householder with no husband present, 3.4% had a male householder with no wife present, and 34.7% were non-families. 29.0% of all households were made up of individuals, and 8.8% had someone living alone who was 65 years of age or older. The average household size was 2.42 and the average family size was 3.03.

The median age in the city was 38.2 years. 24.5% of residents were under the age of 18; 7.6% were between the ages of 18 and 24; 26% were from 25 to 44; 30.4% were from 45 to 64; and 11.4% were 65 years of age or older. The gender makeup of the city was 52.2% male and 47.8% female.

2000 census
As of the census of 2000, there were 2,651 people, 1,034 households, and 695 families living in the city. The population density was 359.7 people per square mile (138.9/km2). There were 1,208 housing units at an average density of 163.9 per square mile (63.3/km2). The racial makeup of the city was 96.72% White, 0.11% African American, 0.49% Native American, 0.60% Asian, 0.04% Pacific Islander, 1.17% from other races, and 0.87% from two or more races. Hispanic or Latino of any race were 3.36% of the population.

There were 1,034 households, out of which 34.1% had children under the age of 18 living with them, 58.3% were married couples living together, 4.9% had a female householder with no husband present, and 32.7% were non-families. 28.6% of all households were made up of individuals, and 10.3% had someone living alone who was 65 years of age or older. The average household size was 2.53 and the average family size was 3.13.

In the city, the population was spread out, with 28.4% under the age of 18, 7.1% from 18 to 24, 28.0% from 25 to 44, 25.7% from 45 to 64, and 10.8% who were 65 years of age or older. The median age was 38 years. For every 100 females, there were 103.9 males. For every 100 females age 18 and over, there were 102.0 males.

The median income for a household in the city was $47,353, and the median income for a family was $55,529. Males had a median income of $45,921 versus $23,382 for females. The per capita income for the city was $21,478. About 5.1% of families and 6.6% of the population were below the poverty line, including 7.1% of those under the age of 18 and 5.7% of those 65 and older.

Economy

Naughton Power Plant is a coal-fired power station located on the southwest edge of Kemmerer.  The plant employs 230 people, and is scheduled to close in 2025. In 2021, TerraPower announced it would open a sodium-cooled nuclear power plant in Kemmerer in 2028, at an estimated cost is $4 billion.  The company plans to employ workers from Naughton Power Plant.

Education
Kemmerer is located within Lincoln County School District #1, which includes Canyon Elementary School, New Frontier High School and Kemmerer High School. Teresa Chaulk is the Superintendent of Schools.

Kemmerer has a public library, a branch of the Lincoln County Library System.

Notable people
 John Buck (born 1980), former MLB catcher
 Jerry Buss (1933–2013), owner of the Los Angeles Lakers, lived in Kemmerer as a teenager
 William L. Carlisle (1890–1964), one of America's last train robbers, lived in Kemmerer after his release from prison in 1936
 Edgar Herschler (1918–1990), governor of Wyoming from 1975 to 1986
 James Cash Penney (1875–1971), founder of the J.C. Penney chain of stores
 Mollie Hemingway (c. 1974), journalist, was raised in Kemmerer

See also
 Fossil Butte National Monument
 Kemmerer Municipal Airport

References

External links
 City of Kemmerer
 Kemmerer Chamber of Commerce

 
Cities in Wyoming
Cities in Lincoln County, Wyoming
County seats in Wyoming
Populated places established in 1897
Coal towns in Wyoming
1897 establishments in Wyoming